Thomas Friedli (June 30, 1946 – April 14, 2008) was an internationally renowned Swiss clarinetist. He died in 2008 in Madeira.

Biography
Thomas Friedli studied in Bern, Lausanne and Paris (with Jacques Lancelot) before winning 1st Prize and "Prix Ernest Ansermet" at the Geneva International Music Competition in 1972 (he would be Jury President of the same competition in 2007). He was from 1971 to 1986 principal clarinetist of the Berner Symphonie-Orchester and then occupied the same post in the Orchestre de Chambre de Lausanne. 
Performing worldwide, he appeared at festivals in Lucerne, Ibiza, Stresa, Gstaad, Bratislava or São Paulo to name a few. He premiered numerous pieces by composers such as Franz Tischhauser or Sándor Veress and received a "Gold Record" from Claves for his recording of the Mozart concerto in A. 
Besides his activity as a soloist and principal clarinetist, Thomas Friedli was also an accomplished chamber musician and was interested in the big repertoire from the Classical and Romantic periods as well as in contemporary music, while he had a particular preference for bringing neglected works to life. A dedicated teacher, he participated in numerous master classes and led a professional performer's class at Conservatoire de Genève from 1978 until his death during a hiking accident in Madeira in April 2008.

Discography
 Wolfgang Amadeus Mozart : Clarinet concerto in A major, KV. 622 (Claves)
 Alexander von Zemlinsky - Max Bruch : Trio in d minor, op. 3; Eight pieces, op. 83 (Claves)
 Johannes Brahms : Clarinet quintet in B minor, op. 115 (Claves)
 Robert Schumann :  (Claves)
 Franz Krommer - Schnyder von Wartensee : Sinfonia concertante op. 80 - Concerto for two clarinets (Claves)
 Richard Strauss - Duetto Concertino with Klaus Thunemann
 French Music for Clarinet (Claves) with Ulrich Koella

References

External links
http://www.amsion.ch/e/professeurs/friedli.asp
https://web.archive.org/web/20110716014113/http://www.scenesmagazine.com/spip.php?article438
Interview with Thomas Friedli (Spanish)

1946 births
2008 deaths
Swiss clarinetists
Swiss male musicians
Winners of the Geneva International Music Competition
20th-century male musicians